The Angelic Conversation is a 1985 arthouse drama film directed by Derek Jarman. Its tone is set by the juxtaposition of slow moving photographic images and Shakespeare's sonnets read by Judi Dench. The film consists primarily of homoerotic images and opaque landscapes through which two men take a journey into their own desires.

Jarman himself described the film as "a dream world, a world of magic and ritual, yet there are images there of the burning cars and radar systems, which remind you there is a price to be paid in order to gain this dream in the face of a world of violence."

The soundtrack to the film was composed and performed by Coil, and it was released as an album of the same name. In 2008 Peter Christopherson of Coil (with David Tibet, Othon Mataragas and Ernesto Tomasini) performed a new live soundtrack to the movie during a special screening at the Turin Lesbian and Gay Film Festival.

The film's music track also includes Benjamin Britten's "Sea Interludes" from Peter Grimes, performed by The Chorus and Orchestra of The Royal Opera House Covent Garden, conducted by Colin Davis.

Shakespeare's sonnets
14 sonnets the film features are:

DVD release

The BFI have released The Angelic Conversation on DVD.

Cast

References

External links
 
 
 

1985 LGBT-related films
1985 films
British drama films
1985 drama films
1980s avant-garde and experimental films
British avant-garde and experimental films
Films directed by Derek Jarman
British LGBT-related films
LGBT-related drama films
Gay-related films
1980s English-language films
1980s British films